Epipactis helleborine var. youngiana, known as Young's helleborine, is a variety of orchid that is endemic to Great Britain. It has also been treated as a separate species, Epipactis youngiana.

Taxonomy 
Epipactis helleborine var. youngiana was discovered in 1975 by Tony Porter, and described as a new species by Porter and A. J. Richards in 1982. The specific epithet commemorates Donald Peter Young, who worked extensively on Epipactis. It is part of the Epipactis helleborine species complex, and cannot be distinguished from the wide-ranging and variable species E. helleborine using genetic markers. It is therefore treated as a variety of the widespread species, as E. helleborine var. youngiana.

Epipactis helleborine var. youngiana was thought to be a hybrid between two other orchid taxa, probably E. dunensis and E. helleborine. More recently it is treated simply as a variety of E. helleborine.

Description 
It differs from  typical E. helleborine in having its basal leaf more than 1.2× as long as broad rather than 1.1× as long as broad, in the basal leaf being "flat, flaccid, unribbed, silky to [the] touch, margins undulate" ("cucullate, stiff, ribbed, coarse to [the] touch, margins not undulate" in E. helleborine), in its flowers – when coloured – being clear pink rather than dirty pink, in the rostellum being nearly as long as the anthers (less than half as long as the anthers in E. helleborine) and in having a shiny ovary with a few stiff hairs, rather than matt with soft hairs or hairless, as in E. helleborine.

Distribution 
Epipactis helleborine var. youngiana was first discovered in southern Northumberland, close to Newcastle-upon-Tyne and along the valley of the River South Tyne; all the sites were associated with metal mining. Populations of similar orchids on bings (coal-mining spoil heaps) in the Central Belt of Scotland have also been assigned to the same taxon. Similar plants also occur on the sand dunes at Kenfig Burrows in South Wales, which have been polluted by the nearby Margam steelworks.

Conservation 
Epipactis helleborine var. youngiana is considered an endangered species in the United Kingdom, and is protected under Schedule 8 of the Wildlife and Countryside Act 1981.

References

External links 

helleborine var. youngiana
Endemic flora of the United Kingdom
Orchids of Europe
Plants described in 1982